The 2017 Heilbronner Neckarcup was a professional tennis tournament played on clay courts. It was the fourth edition of the tournament which was part of the 2017 ATP Challenger Tour. It took place in Heilbronn, Germany between 15 and 21 May 2017.

Point distribution

Singles main-draw entrants

Seeds

 1 Rankings are as of May 8, 2017.

Other entrants
The following players received wildcards into the singles main draw:
  Daniel Altmaier
  Daniel Brands
  Marsel İlhan
  Yannick Maden

The following players received entry from the qualifying draw:
  Sam Groth
  Dominik Köpfer
  Filip Krajinović
  Cedrik-Marcel Stebe

Champions

Singles

 Filip Krajinović def.  Norbert Gombos 6–3, 6–2.

Doubles

 Roman Jebavý /  Antonio Šančić def.  Adil Shamasdin /  Igor Zelenay 6–4, 6–1.

External links
Official Website

Heilbronner Neckarcup
Heilbronner Neckarcup
May 2017 sports events in Germany
2017 in German tennis